Paola Pigni (30 December 1945 – 11 June 2021) was an Italian middle- and long-distance runner. She was a three-time world champion in cross country and held the world record over five distance running events on the track, from 1500m to 10,000m.

Biography

Pigni competed for her native country at the 1972 Summer Olympics held in Munich, West Germany, where she won the bronze medal in the women's 1500 m.

She was the winner of the France version of the 1970 International Cross Country Championships. She followed this up by winning the first two women's titles at the IAAF World Cross Country Championships in 1973 and 1974.

World records

In an era when the popularity of female middle distance running was increasing, Pigni established six world records (those recognized are signed with an asterisk).

5000 m: 16:17.4 ( Formia, 1 May 1969)
5000 m: 15:53.6 ( Milan, 2 September 1969)
1500 m: 4:12.4 ( Milan, 2 December 1969)*
10000 m: 35:30.5 ( Milan, 9 May 1970)
3000 m: 9:09.2 ( Formia, 11 May 1972)
Mile: 4:29.5 ( Viareggio, 8 August 1973)*

Achievements

National titles

She won 19 national championships at senior level.
Italian Athletics Championships
400 m: 1965, 1967 (2)
800 m: 1965, 1966, 1967, 1968, 1969, 1973 (6)
1500 m: 1970, 1972, 1974, 1975 (4)
3000 m: 1974 (1)
Cross country running: 1967, 1968, 1969, 1970, 1973, 1974 (6)

See also

 Legends of Italian sport - Walk of Fame
Italian all-time top lists - 1500 m
 FIDAL Hall of Fame

References

External links
 

1945 births
2021 deaths
Athletes from Milan
Italian female middle-distance runners
Olympic athletes of Italy
Olympic bronze medalists for Italy
Athletes (track and field) at the 1968 Summer Olympics
Athletes (track and field) at the 1972 Summer Olympics
European Athletics Championships medalists
World Athletics Cross Country Championships winners
World record setters in athletics (track and field)
International Cross Country Championships winners
Medalists at the 1972 Summer Olympics
Olympic bronze medalists in athletics (track and field)
Mediterranean Games gold medalists for Italy
Mediterranean Games silver medalists for Italy
Athletes (track and field) at the 1971 Mediterranean Games
Athletes (track and field) at the 1975 Mediterranean Games
Universiade medalists in athletics (track and field)
Mediterranean Games medalists in athletics
Universiade gold medalists for Italy
Italian Athletics Championships winners
20th-century Italian women
21st-century Italian women